The 32nd edition of the annual Hypo-Meeting took place on May 27 and May 28, 2006 in Götzis, Austria. The track and field competition, featuring a decathlon (men) and a heptathlon (women) event was part of the 2006 IAAF World Combined Events Challenge.

Men's Decathlon

Schedule

May 27

May 28

Records

Results

Women's Heptathlon

Schedule

May 27

May 28

Records

Results

See also
2006 European Athletics Championships – Men's Decathlon
2006 Decathlon Year Ranking
2006 European Athletics Championships – Women's heptathlon

References
 decathlon2000
 IAAF results

2006
Hypo-Meeting
Hypo-Meeting